Abraham Lincoln: The Man (also called Standing Lincoln) is a larger-than-life size  bronze statue of Abraham Lincoln, the 16th president of the United States. The original statue is in Lincoln Park in Chicago, and later re-castings of the statue have been given as diplomatic gifts from the United States to the United Kingdom, and to Mexico.

Completed by Augustus Saint-Gaudens in 1887, it has been described as the most important sculpture of Lincoln from the 19th century. At the time, the New York Evening Post called it "the most important achievement American sculpture has yet produced." Abraham Lincoln II, Lincoln's only grandson, was present, among a crowd of 10,000, at the initial unveiling.  The artist later created the Abraham Lincoln: The Head of State ('Seated Lincoln') sculpture in Chicago's Grant Park.

Design
The sculpture depicts a contemplative Lincoln rising from a chair of state, about to give a speech. It is set upon a pedestal and, in Chicago, an exedra designed by architect Stanford White. White's setting includes carved and bronze caste excerpts of Lincoln's writings.  Chicago businessman Eli Bates (1806–1881) provided $40,000 in his will for the statue. Saint-Gaudens was specially selected for the commission after a design competition failed to produce a winning artist.  Saint-Gaudens, who revered the President, had seen Lincoln at the time of his inauguration, and later viewed Lincoln's body lying in state. For his design, the artist also relied on a life mask and hand casts made of Lincoln in 1860 by Leonard W. Volk. While planning and working on the Standing Lincoln, Saint-Gaudens was first enticed to what would become his home and studio, and an associated artist's colony. To convince him to vacation near Cornish, New Hampshire, a friend told him the area had "many Lincoln-shaped men".

Reception and legacy
The sculpture's naturalism influenced a generation of artists. One sculptor Standing Lincoln  significantly influenced was Daniel Chester French, who would go on to create the Lincoln statute at the Lincoln Memorial in 1920. The monument was also a favorite of Hull House founder Jane Addams, who once wrote, "I walked the wearisome way from Hull-House to Lincoln Park ... in order to look at and gain magnanimous counsel from the statue." Journalist Andrew Ferguson discusses the statue at length in his book Land of Lincoln, writing that the statue presents "a sort of world-weariness that seems almost kind". The City of Chicago awarded the monument landmark status on December 12, 2001. It is located near the Chicago History Museum and North Avenue.

Replicas
Replicas of the statue stand at Lincoln Tomb in Springfield, Illinois, Parque Lincoln in Mexico City, and Parliament Square in London. The Parliament Square statue was given to Britain in July 1920. The American Ambassador made a formal presentation at Central Hall, Westminster, where Prime Minister David Lloyd George accepted the gift on behalf of the people of Britain; after a procession to Parliament Square, the statue was unveiled by Prince Arthur, Duke of Connaught. The Mexico City statue was presented by United States President Lyndon Johnson to the people of Mexico in 1964.  Later, Johnson received a small copy of the bust from the statue, which since then is often seen displayed in the Oval Office of the White House.  In 2016, a newly cast replica of the full-height statue was installed in the garden at Saint-Gaudens National Historic Site in Cornish.

Reductions
From 1910 onwards, Saint-Gaudens' widow, Augusta, oversaw the casting of a number of smaller replicas of the statue, reduced to slightly under one-third the size of the original.
 Metropolitan Museum of Art, New York: first cast – sold to Clara Stone Hay, 1911, previously on display in Washington. The sculpture belonged to the family of Lincoln's White House aide John Hay.
 Yale University Art Gallery, New Haven: second cast – gift of Allison Armour, 1937, originally purchased by George Armour
 Harvard Art Museums: third cast – purchased from Doll & Richards, Boston, by Grenville L. Winthrop, 1912
 Hotchkiss School: donated by Homer Sawyer, possibly in 1939–40 
 Carnegie Museum of Art, Pittsburgh: gift of Charles Rosenbloom, 1943
 Chazy School District, New York: purchased 1923 by William H. Miner 
 Detroit Institute of Art: donated by Mrs Walter O. Briggs, 1952
 Forest Lawn Memorial Park, Hollywood Hills: cast in 1940 by Gorham
 Greenfield Village and Henry Ford Museum, Dearborn, Michigan: gift of the Ford Motor Company
 Carnegie Library, Jackson District Library, Jackson, Michigan: gift, 1915
 Lincoln Memorial University Library, Harrogate, Tennessee: donated by Sarah Lynn in memory of her husband, John Lynn, in 1938
 Lincoln Tomb, Springfield, Illinois
 Newark Museum, Newark, New Jersey: gift of Franklin Murphy, 1920
 Saint-Gaudens Memorial, Cornish, New Hampshire: donated by Augusta Saint-Gaudens, 1919
 Fay School, Southborough, Massachusetts
 Abraham Lincoln School of Languages, Havana, Cuba

See also
 List of public art in Chicago
 List of public art in Mexico City
 List of statues of Abraham Lincoln
 List of sculptures of presidents of the United States

Notes

References

External links

Augustus Saint-Gaudens, Master Sculptor, exhibition catalog fully online as PDF from The Metropolitan Museum of Art, which contains material on this statue

1887 sculptures
Bronze sculptures in the City of Westminster
Bronze sculptures in Illinois
Chicago Landmarks
Monuments and memorials in London
Monuments and memorials in Mexico City
Outdoor sculptures in Chicago
Outdoor sculptures in London
Outdoor sculptures in Mexico City
Parliament Square
Sculptures by Augustus Saint-Gaudens
Statues in Illinois
Statues in London
Statues in Mexico City
Statues of Abraham Lincoln
Monuments and memorials to Abraham Lincoln
Buildings and monuments honouring American presidents in the United Kingdom
Monuments and memorials to Abraham Lincoln in the United States
Polanco, Mexico City